Grevillea corrugata is a species of flowering plant in the family Proteaceae and is endemic to a restricted area in the south-west of Western Australia. It is a dense shrub with deeply divided leaves usually with three to five sharply-pointed, linear lobes, and white to cream-coloured flowers.

Description

Taxonomy
Grevillea corrugata was first formally described in 1993 by Peter M. Olde and Neil R. Marriott in the journal Nuytsia from specimens collected by Olde near Bindoon in 1992. The specific epithet (corrugata) means "strongly wrinkled", referring to the surface of the fruit.

Distribution and habitat
This grevillea is only known from the type location where it grows in disturbed eucalypt woodland.

Conservation status
Grevillea corrugata is listed as "endangered" under the Australian Government Environment Protection and Biodiversity Conservation Act 1999 and "Threatened" by the Western Australian Government Department of Parks and Wildlife.

References

corrugata
Eudicots of Western Australia
Proteales of Australia
Plants described in 1993